An election was held on November 6, 2018 to elect 10 of the 21 members to Delaware's State Senate. The election coincided with the elections for other offices, including U.S. Senate, U.S. House of Representatives and State House. The primary election was held on September 6, 2018.

Delaware Republicans needed to have a net gain of 1 seat to flip the chamber from the Democrats, however, Democrats increased their majority in the Senate by gaining 1 seat (winning 12 seats compared to 9 seats for the Republicans).

Results Summary

Detailed results

District 2
Incumbent Democrat Majority Leader Margaret Rose Henry has represented the 2nd district since 1994. Henry retired and fellow Democrat Darius Brown won the open seat.

District 3
Incumbent Democrat Robert Marshall has represented the 3rd district since 1979. Marshall retired and fellow Democrat Elizabeth Lockman won the open seat.

District 4
Incumbent Republican Gregory Lavelle has represented the 4th district since 2013. Lavelle lost re-election to Democrat Laura Sturgeon.

District 6
Incumbent Republican Ernesto Lopez has represented the 6th district since 2013.

District 10
Incumbent Democrat Stephanie Hansen has represented the 10th district since 2017.

District 11
Incumbent Democrat Bryan Townsend has represented the 11th district since 2013.

District 16
Incumbent Republican Colin Bonini has represented the 16th district since 1995.

District 17
Incumbent Democrat Brian Bushweller has represented the 17th district since 2009. Bushweller retired and fellow Democrat Charles Paradee won the open seat.

District 18
Incumbent Republican Minority Leader Gary Simpson has represented the 18th district since 1999. Simpson retired and fellow Republican David Wilson won the open seat.

District 21
Incumbent Republican Bryant Richardson has represented the 21st district since 2015.

References

Delaware Senate
State Senate
2018